In physical organic chemistry, a kinetic isotope effect (KIE) is the change in the reaction rate of a chemical reaction when one of the atoms in the reactants is replaced by one of its isotopes. Formally, it is the ratio of rate constants for the reactions involving the light (kL) and the heavy (kH) isotopically substituted reactants (isotopologues):

This change in reaction rate is a quantum mechanical effect that primarily results from heavier isotopologues having lower vibrational frequencies compared to their lighter counterparts. In most cases, this implies a greater energetic input needed for heavier isotopologues to reach the transition state (or, in rare cases, the dissociation limit), and consequently, a slower reaction rate.  The study of kinetic isotope effects can help the elucidation of the reaction mechanism of certain chemical reactions and is occasionally exploited in drug development to improve unfavorable pharmacokinetics by protecting metabolically vulnerable C-H bonds.

Background 

The kinetic isotope effect is considered to be one of the most essential and sensitive tools for the study of reaction mechanisms, the knowledge of which allows the improvement of the desirable qualities of the corresponding reactions. For example, kinetic isotope effects can be used to reveal whether a nucleophilic substitution reaction follows a unimolecular (SN1) or bimolecular (SN2) pathway.

In the reaction of methyl bromide and cyanide (shown in the introduction), the observed methyl carbon kinetic isotope effect indicates an SN2 mechanism. Depending on the pathway, different strategies may be used to stabilize the transition state of the rate-determining step of the reaction and improve the reaction rate and selectivity, which are important for industrial applications.

Isotopic rate changes are most pronounced when the relative mass change is greatest, since the effect is related to vibrational frequencies of the affected bonds. For instance, changing a hydrogen atom (H) to its isotope deuterium (D) represents a 100% increase in mass, whereas in replacing carbon-12 with carbon-13, the mass increases by only 8 percent. The rate of a reaction involving a C–H bond is typically 6–10 times faster than the corresponding C–D bond, whereas a 12C reaction is only 4 percent faster than the corresponding 13C reaction (even though, in both cases, the isotope is one atomic mass unit heavier).

Isotopic substitution can modify the rate of reaction in a variety of ways. In many cases, the rate difference can be rationalized by noting that the mass of an atom affects the vibrational frequency of the chemical bond that it forms, even if the potential energy surface for the reaction is nearly identical. Heavier isotopes will (classically) lead to lower vibration frequencies, or, viewed quantum mechanically, will have lower zero-point energy. With a lower zero-point energy, more energy must be supplied to break the bond, resulting in a higher activation energy for bond cleavage, which in turn lowers the measured rate (see, for example, the Arrhenius equation).

Classification

Primary kinetic isotope effects 
A primary kinetic isotope effect may be found when a bond to the isotopically labeled atom is being formed or broken. Depending on the way a kinetic isotope effect is probed (parallel measurement of rates vs. intermolecular competition vs. intramolecular competition), the observation of a primary kinetic isotope effect is indicative of breaking/forming a bond to the isotope at the rate-limiting step, or subsequent product-determining step(s).  (The misconception that a primary kinetic isotope effect must reflect bond cleavage/formation to the isotope at the rate-limiting step is frequently repeated in textbooks and the primary literature: see the section on experiments below.)

For the previously mentioned nucleophilic substitution reactions, primary kinetic isotope effects have been investigated for both the leaving groups, the nucleophiles, and the α-carbon at which the substitution occurs. Interpretation of the leaving group kinetic isotope effects had been difficult at first due to significant contributions from temperature independent factors. Kinetic isotope effects at the α-carbon can be used to develop some understanding into the symmetry of the transition state in SN2 reactions, although this kinetic isotope effect is less sensitive than what would be ideal, also due to contribution from non-vibrational factors.

Secondary kinetic isotope effects 
A secondary kinetic isotope effect is observed when no bond to the isotopically labeled atom in the reactant is broken or formed. Secondary kinetic isotope effects tend to be much smaller than primary kinetic isotope effects; however, secondary deuterium isotope effects can be as large as 1.4 per deuterium atom, and techniques have been developed to measure heavy-element isotope effects to very high precision, so secondary kinetic isotope effects are still very useful for elucidating reaction mechanisms.

For the aforementioned nucleophilic substitution reactions, secondary hydrogen kinetic isotope effects at the α-carbon provide a direct means to distinguish between SN1 and SN2 reactions. It has been found that SN1 reactions typically lead to large secondary kinetic isotope effects, approaching to their theoretical maximum at about 1.22, while SN2 reactions typically yield primary kinetic isotope effects that are very close to or less than unity. Kinetic isotope effects that are greater than 1 are referred to as normal kinetic isotope effects, while kinetic isotope effects that are less than one are referred to as inverse kinetic isotope effects. In general, smaller force constants in the transition state are expected to yield a normal kinetic isotope effect, and larger force constants in the transition state are expected to yield an inverse kinetic isotope effect when stretching vibrational contributions dominate the kinetic isotope effect.

The magnitudes of such secondary isotope effects at the α-carbon atom are largely determined by the Cα-H(D) vibrations. For an SN1 reaction, since the carbon atom is converted into an sp2 hybridized carbenium ion during the transition state for the rate-determining step with an increase in Cα-H(D) bond order, an inverse kinetic isotope effect would be expected if only the stretching vibrations were important. The observed large normal kinetic isotope effects are found to be caused by significant out-of-plane bending vibrational contributions when going from the reactants to the transition state of carbenium ion formation. For SN2 reactions, bending vibrations still play an important role for the kinetic isotope effect, but stretching vibrational contributions are of more comparable magnitude, and the resulting kinetic isotope effect may be normal or inverse depending on the specific contributions of the respective vibrations.

Theory 
The theoretical treatment of isotope effects relies heavily on transition state theory, which assumes a single potential energy surface for the reaction, and a barrier between the reactants and the products on this surface, on top of which resides the transition state. The kinetic isotope effect arises largely from the changes to vibrational ground states produced by the isotopic perturbation along the minimum energy pathway of the potential energy surface, which may only be accounted for with quantum mechanical treatments of the system. Depending on the mass of the atom that moves along the reaction coordinate and nature (width and height) of the energy barrier, quantum mechanical tunneling may also make a large contribution to an observed kinetic isotope effect and may need to be separately considered, in addition to the "semi-classical" transition state theory model.

The deuterium kinetic isotope effect (2H KIE) is by far the most common, useful, and well-understood type of kinetic isotope effect.  The accurate prediction of the numerical value of a deuterium kinetic isotope effect using density functional theory calculations is now relatively routine.  Moreover, several qualitative and semi-quantitative models allow rough estimates of deuterium isotope effects to be made without calculations, often providing enough information to rationalize experimental data or even support or refute different mechanistic possibilities.  Starting materials containing deuterium are often commercially available, making the synthesis of isotopically enriched starting materials relatively straightforward.  Also, due to the large relative difference in the mass of deuterium and protium and the attendant differences in vibrational frequencies, the magnitude of the isotope effect is larger than any other pair of isotopes except protium and tritium, allowing both primary and secondary isotope effects to be easily measured and interpreted.  In contrast, secondary effects are generally very small for heavier elements and close in magnitude to the experimental uncertainty, which complicates their interpretation and limits their utility. In the context of isotope effects, hydrogen is frequently used to refer to the light isotope, protium (1H), specifically.  In the rest of this article, reference to hydrogen and deuterium in parallel grammatical constructions or direct comparisons between them should be interpreted as referring to protium and deuterium.

The theory of kinetic isotope effects was first formulated by Jacob Bigeleisen in 1949. Bigeleisen's general formula for deuterium kinetic isotope effects (which is also applicable to heavier elements) is given below. It employs transition state theory and a statistical mechanical treatment of translational, rotational, and vibrational levels for the calculation of rate constants kH and kD.  However, this formula is "semi-classical" in that it neglects the contribution from quantum tunneling, which is often introduced as a separate correction factor.  Bigeleisen's formula also does not deal with differences in non-bonded repulsive interactions caused by the slightly shorter C–D bond compared to a C–H bond.  In the equation, quantities with the subscripts H or D refer to the hydrogen- or deuterium-substituted species, respectively, while quantities with or without the double-dagger, ‡, refer to the transition state or reactant ground state, respectively. (Strictly speaking, a  term resulting from an isotopic difference in transmission coefficients should also be included.)

,

where we define

Here, h is the Planck constant, kB is the Boltzmann constant,  is the frequency of the vibration, expressed in wavenumbers, c is the speed of light, NA is the Avogadro constant, and R is the universal gas constant.  The σX (X = H or D) are the symmetry numbers for the reactants and transition states. The MX are the molecular masses of the corresponding species, and the IqX (q = x, y, or z) terms are the moments of inertia about the three principal axes. The uiX are directly proportional to the corresponding vibrational frequencies, νi, and the vibrational zero-point energy (see below).  The integers N and N‡ are the number of atoms in the reactants and the transition states, respectively. The complicated expression given above can be represented as the product of four separate factors:

.

For the special case of deuterium isotope effects, we will argue that the first three terms can be treated as equal to or well approximated by unity.  The first factor S (containing the σX) is the ratio of the symmetry numbers for the various species.  This will be a rational number (a ratio of integers) that depends on the number of molecular and bond rotations leading to the permutation of identical atoms or groups in the reactants and the transition state. For systems of low symmetry, all σX (reactant and transition state) will be unity; thus S can often be neglected. The MMI factor (containing the MX and IqX) refers to the ratio of the molecular masses and the moments of inertia. Since hydrogen and deuterium tend to be much lighter compared to most reactants and transition states, there is little difference in the molecular masses and moments of inertia between H and D containing molecules, so the MMI factor is usually also approximated as unity. The EXC factor (containing the product of vibrational partition functions) corrects for the kinetic isotope effect caused by the reactions of vibrationally excited molecules. The fraction of molecules with enough energy to have excited state A–H/D bond vibrations is generally small for reactions at or near room temperature (bonds to hydrogen usually vibrate at 1000 cm−1 or higher, so exp(-ui) = exp(-hνi/kBT) < 0.01 at 298 K, resulting in negligible contributions from the 1–exp(-ui) factors). Hence, for hydrogen/deuterium kinetic isotope effects, the observed values are typically dominated by the last factor, ZPE (an exponential function of vibrational zero-point energy differences), consisting of contributions from the zero-point energy differences for each of the vibrational modes of the reactants and transition state, which can be represented as follows:

,

where we define

The sums in the exponent of the second expression can be interpreted as running over all vibrational modes of the reactant ground state and the transition state. Alternatively, one may interpret them as running over those modes unique to the reactant or the transition state or whose vibrational frequencies change substantially upon advancing along the reaction coordinate. Thus, in practice, deuterium KIEs are often largely dependent on a handful of key vibrational modes because of this cancellation, making qualitative analyses of kH/kD possible.

As mentioned, especially for hydrogen/deuterium substitution, most kinetic isotope effects arise from the difference in zero-point energy (ZPE) between the reactants and the transition state of the isotopologues in question, and this difference can be understood qualitatively with the following description: within the Born–Oppenheimer approximation, the potential energy surface is the same for both isotopic species. However, a quantum-mechanical treatment of the energy introduces discrete vibrational levels onto this curve, and the lowest possible energy state of a molecule corresponds to the lowest vibrational energy level, which is slightly higher in energy than the minimum of the potential energy curve. This difference, referred to as the zero-point energy, is a manifestation of the Heisenberg uncertainty principle that necessitates an uncertainty in the C-H or C-D bond length. Since the heavier (in this case the deuterated) species behaves more "classically," its vibrational energy levels are closer to the classical potential energy curve, and it has a lower zero-point energy. The zero-point energy differences between the two isotopic species, at least in most cases, diminish in the transition state, since the bond force constant decreases during bond breaking. Hence, the lower zero-point energy of the deuterated species translates into a larger activation energy for its reaction, as shown in the following figure, leading to a normal kinetic isotope effect. This effect should, in principle, be taken into account all 3N−6 vibrational modes for the starting material and 3N‡−7 vibrational modes at the transition state (one mode, the one corresponding to the reaction coordinate, is missing at the transition state, since a bond breaks and there is no restorative force against the motion). The harmonic oscillator is a good approximation for a vibrating bond, at least for low-energy vibrational states. Thus, we can readily interpret the factor of ½ and the sums of  terms over ground state and transition state vibrational modes in the exponent of the simplified formula above. For a harmonic oscillator, the vibrational frequency is inversely proportional to the square root of the reduced mass of the vibrating system:

,

where kf is the force constant.  Moreover, the reduced mass is approximated by the mass of the light atom of the system, X = H or D.  Because mD is approximately 2mH,

.

In the case of a homolytic C–H/D bond dissociation, the transition state term disappears, and neglecting other vibrational modes, kH/kD = exp(½Δui).  Thus, a larger isotope effect is observed for a stiffer ("stronger") C–H/D bond.  For most reactions of interest, a hydrogen atom is transferred between two atoms, with a transition-state [A···H···B]‡ and vibrational modes at the transition state need to be accounted for.  Nevertheless, it is still generally true that cleavage of a bond with a higher vibrational frequency will give a larger isotope effect.

To calculate the maximum possible value for a non-tunneling deuterium KIE, we consider the case in which the zero-point energy difference between the stretching vibrations of a typical carbon-hydrogen bond (3000 cm−1) and carbon-deuterium bond (2200 cm−1) disappears in the transition state (an energy difference of (1/2)(3000 – 2200 cm−1) = 400 cm−1, or about 1.15 kcal/mol), without any compensation from a zero-point energy difference at the transition state (e.g., from the symmetric A···H···B stretch, which is unique to the transition state).  The simplified formula given above predicts a maximum for kH/kD as 6.9. If the complete disappearance of two bending vibrations is also included, kH/kD values as large as 15-20 can be predicted. Bending frequencies are very unlikely to vanish in the transition state, however, and there are only a few cases in which kH/kD values exceed 7-8 near room temperature. Furthermore, it is often found that tunneling is a major factor when they do exceed such values. A value of kH/kD ~ 10 is thought to be maximal for a semi-classical primary kinetic isotope effect (no tunneling) for reactions taking place around 298 K.  (The formula for kH/kD has a temperature dependence, so larger isotope effects are possible at lower temperatures). Depending on the nature of the transition state of H-transfer (symmetrical vs. "early" or "late" and linear vs. bent), the extent to which a primary deuterium isotope effect approaches this maximum varies.  A model developed by Westheimer predicted that symmetrical (thermoneutral, by the Hammond Postulate), linear transition states have the largest isotope effects, while transition states that are "early" or "late" (for exothermic or endothermic reactions, respectively), or nonlinear (e.g. cyclic) exhibit smaller effects.  These predictions have since received extensive experimental support.

For secondary deuterium isotope effects, Streitwieser proposed that weakening (or strengthening, in the case of an inverse isotope effect) of bending modes from the reactant ground state to the transition state are largely responsible for observed isotope effects.  These changes are attributed to a change in steric environment when the carbon bound to the H/D undergoes rehybridization from sp3 to sp2 or vice versa (an α secondary kinetic isotope effect), or bond weakening due to hyperconjugation in cases where a carbocation is being generated one carbon atom away (a β secondary kinetic isotope effect). These isotope effects have a theoretical maximum of kH/kD = 20.5 ≈ 1.4.  For a secondary kinetic isotope effect at the α position, rehybridization from sp3 to sp2 produces a normal isotope effect, while rehybridization from sp2 to sp3 results in an inverse isotope effect with a theoretical minimum of kH/kD = 2-0.5 ≈ 0.7.  In practice, kH/kD ~ 1.1-1.2 and kH/kD ~ 0.8-0.9 are typical for α secondary kinetic isotope effects, while kH/kD ~ 1.15-1.3 are typical for β secondary kinetic isotope effect.  For reactants containing several isotopically substituted β-hydrogen atoms, the observed isotope effect is often the result of several H/D's at the β position acting in concert.  In these cases, the effect of each isotopically labeled atom is multiplicative, and cases where kH/kD > 2 are not uncommon.

The following simple expressions relating deuterium and tritium kinetic isotope effects, which are also known as the Swain equation (or the Swain-Schaad-Stivers equations), can be derived from the general expression given above using some simplifications:

;

i.e.,

.

In deriving these expressions, the reasonable approximation that reduced masses are approximately equal to the masses of the hydrogen, deuterium, or tritium was used. In addition, the vibrational motion was assumed to be approximated by a harmonic oscillator, so that  (X = H, D, or T). The subscript "s" refers to these "semi-classical" kinetic isotope effects, which disregard quantum tunneling. Tunneling contributions must be treated separately as a correction factor.

For isotope effects involving elements other than hydrogen, many of these simplifications are not valid, and the magnitude of the isotope effect may depend strongly on some or all of the neglected factors. Thus, kinetic isotope effects for elements other than hydrogen are often much more difficult to rationalize or interpret.  In many cases and especially for hydrogen-transfer reactions, contributions to kinetic isotope effects from tunneling are significant (see below).

Tunneling 

In some cases, an additional rate enhancement is seen for the lighter isotope, possibly due to quantum mechanical tunnelling. This is typically only observed for reactions involving bonds to hydrogen atoms.
Tunneling occurs when a molecule penetrates through a potential energy barrier rather than over it. Although not allowed by the laws of classical mechanics, particles can pass through classically forbidden regions of space in quantum mechanics based on wave–particle duality.

Analysis of tunneling can be made using Bell's modification of the Arrhenius equation, which includes the addition of a tunneling factor, Q:

where A is the Arrhenius parameter, E is the barrier height and

where  and 

Examination of the β term shows exponential dependency on the mass of the particle. As a result, tunneling is much more likely for a lighter particle such as hydrogen. Simply doubling the mass of a tunneling proton by replacing it with its deuterium isotope drastically reduces the rate of such reactions. As a result, very large kinetic isotope effects are observed that can not be accounted for by differences in zero point energies.

In addition, the β term depends linearly with barrier width, 2a. As with mass, tunneling is greatest for small barrier widths. Optimal tunneling distances of protons between donor and acceptor atom is 0.4 Å.

Transient kinetic isotope effect 

Isotopic effect expressed with the equations given above only refer to reactions that can be described with first-order kinetics. In all instances in which this is not possible, transient kinetic isotope effects should be taken into account using the GEBIK and GEBIF equations.

Experiments 

Simmons and Hartwig refer to the following three cases as the main types of kinetic isotope effect experiments involving C-H bond functionalization:

A) KIE determined from absolute rates of two parallel reactions

In this experiment, the rate constants for the normal substrate and its isotopically labeled analogue are determined independently, and the KIE is obtained as a ratio of the two. The accuracy of the measured KIE is severely limited by the accuracy with which each of these rate constants can be measured. Furthermore, reproducing the exact conditions in the two parallel reactions can be very challenging. Nevertheless, a measurement of a large kinetic isotope effect through direct comparison of rate constants is indicative that C-H bond cleavage occurs at the rate-determining step. (A smaller value could indicate an isotope effect due to a pre-equilibrium, so that the C-H bond cleavage occurs somewhere before the rate-determining step.)

B) KIE determined from an intermolecular competition

In this type of experiment, the same substrates that are used in Experiment A are employed, but they are allowed in to react in the same container, instead of two separate containers. The kinetic isotope effect from this experiment is determined by the relative amount of products formed from C-H versus C-D functionalization (or it can be inferred from the relative amounts of unreacted starting materials). It is necessary to quench the reaction before it goes to completion to observe the kinetic isotope effect (see the Evaluation section below).  Generally, the reaction is halted at low conversion (~5 to 10% conversion) or a large excess (> 5 equiv.) of the isotopic mixture is used.  This experiment type ensures that both C-H and C-D bond functionalizations occur under exactly the same conditions, and the ratio of products from C-H and C-D bond functionalizations can be measured with much greater precision than the rate constants in Experiment A. Moreover, only a single measurement of product concentrations from a single sample is required. However, an observed kinetic isotope effect from this experiment is more difficult to interpret, since it may either mean that C-H bond cleavage occurs during the rate-determining step or at a product-determining step ensuing the rate-determining step. The absence of a kinetic isotope effect, at least according to Simmons and Hartwig, is nonetheless indicative of the C-H bond cleavage not occurring during the rate-determining step.

C) KIE determined from an intramolecular competition

This type of experiment is analogous to Experiment B, except this time there is an intramolecular competition for the C-H or C-D bond functionalization. In most cases, the substrate possesses a directing group (DG) between the C-H and C-D bonds. Calculation of the kinetic isotope effect from this experiment and its interpretation follow the same considerations as that of Experiment B.  However, the results of Experiments B and C will differ if the irreversible binding of the isotope-containing substrate takes place in Experiment B prior to the cleavage of the C-H or C-D bond.  In such a scenario, an isotope effect may be observed in Experiment C (where choice of the isotope can take place even after substrate binding) but not in Experiment B (since the choice of whether C-H or C-D bond cleaves is already made as soon as the substrate binds irreversibly).  In contrast to Experiment B, the reaction does not need to be halted at low consumption of isotopic starting material to obtain an accurate kH/kD, since the ratio of H and D in the starting material is 1:1, regardless of the extent of conversion.

One non-C-H activation example of different isotope effects being observed in the case of intermolecular (Experiment B) and intramolecular (Experiment C) competition is the photolysis of diphenyldiazomethane in the presence of t-butylamine.  To explain this result, the formation of diphenylcarbene, followed by irreversible nucleophilic attack by t-butylamine was proposed.  Because there is little isotopic difference in the rate of nucleophilic attack, the intermolecular experiment resulted in a KIE close to 1.  In the intramolecular case, however, the product ratio is determined by the proton transfer that occurs after the nucleophilic attack, a process for which there is a substantial KIE of 2.6.

Thus, Experiments A, B, and C will give results of differing levels of precision and require different experimental setup and ways of analyzing data. As a result, the feasibility of each type of experiment will depend on the kinetic and stoichiometric profile of the reaction, as well as the physical characteristics of the reaction mixture (e.g., homogeneous vs. heterogeneous).  Moreover, as noted in the paragraph above, the experiments provide kinetic isotope effect data for different steps of a multi-step reaction, depending on the relative locations of the rate-limiting step, product-determining steps, and/or C-H/D cleavage step.

The hypothetical examples below illustrate common scenarios. Consider the following reaction coordinate diagram.  For a reaction with this profile, all three experiments (A, B, and C) will yield a significant primary kinetic isotope effect:

On the other hand, if a reaction follows the following energy profile, in which the C-H or C-D bond cleavage is irreversible but occurs after the rate-determining step (RDS), no significant kinetic isotope effect will be observed with Experiment A, since the overall rate is not affected by the isotopic substitution. Nevertheless, the irreversible C-H bond cleavage step will give a primary kinetic isotope effect with the other two experiments, since the second step would still affect the product distribution. Therefore, with Experiments B and C, it is possible to observe the kinetic isotope effect even if C-H or C-D bond cleavage occurs not in the rate-determining step, but in the product-determining step.

Evaluation of rate constant ratios from intermolecular competition reactions 
In competition reactions, the kinetic isotope effect is calculated from isotopic product or remaining reactant ratios after the reaction, but these ratios depend strongly on the extent of completion of the reaction. Most commonly, the isotopic substrate will consist of molecules labeled in a specific position and their unlabeled, ordinary counterparts. It is also possible in case of 13C kinetic isotope effects, as well as similar cases, to simply rely on the natural abundance of the isotopic carbon for the kinetic isotope effect experiments, eliminating the need for isotopic labeling.
The two isotopic substrates will react through the same mechanism, but at different rates. The ratio between the amounts of the two species in the reactants and the products will thus change gradually over the course of the reaction, and this gradual change can be treated in the following manner:
Assume that two isotopic molecules, A1 and A2, undergo irreversible competition reactions in the following manner:

The kinetic isotope effect for this scenario is found to be:

Where F1 and F2 refer to the fraction of conversions for the isotopic species A1 and A2, respectively.

Isotopic enrichment of the starting material can be calculated from the dependence of R/R0 on F1 for various kinetic isotope effects, yielding the following figure.  Because of the exponential dependence, even very low kinetic isotope effects lead to large changes in isotopic composition of the starting material at high conversions.

When the products are followed, the kinetic isotope effect can be calculated using the products ratio RP along with R0 as follows:

Kinetic isotope effect measurement at natural abundance 
Kinetic isotope effect measurement at natural abundance is a simple general method for measuring kinetic isotope effects (KIE) for chemical reactions performed with materials of natural abundance. This technique for measuring KIEs overcomes many limitations of previous KIE measurement methods.  KIE measurements from isotopically labeled materials require a new synthesis for each isotopically labeled material (a process often prohibitively difficult), a competition reaction, and an analysis. The KIE measurement at natural abundance avoids these issues by taking advantage of high precision quantitative techniques (nuclear magnetic resonance spectroscopy, isotope-ratio mass spectrometry) to site selectively measure kinetic fractionation of isotopes, in either product or starting material for a given chemical reaction.

Single-pulse NMR 
Quantitative single-pulse nuclear magnetic resonance spectroscopy (NMR) is a method amenable for measuring kinetic fractionation of isotopes for natural abundance KIE measurements. Pascal et al. were inspired by studies demonstrating dramatic variations of deuterium within identical compounds from different sources and hypothesized that NMR could be used to measure deuterium kinetic isotope effects at natural abundance. Pascal and coworkers tested their hypothesis by studying the insertion reaction of dimethyl diazomalonate into cyclohexane. Pascal et al. measured a KIE of 2.2 using  NMR for materials of natural abundance.

Singleton and coworkers demonstrated the capacity of  NMR based natural abundance KIE measurements for studying the mechanism of the [4 + 2] cycloaddition of isoprene with maleic anhydride. Previous studies by Gajewski on isotopically enrich materials observed KIE results that suggested an asynchronous transition state, but were always consistent, within error, for a perfectly synchronous reaction mechanism.

This work by Singleton et al. established the measurement of multiple  KIE's within the design of a single experiment. These  and  KIE measurements determined at natural abundance found the "inside" hydrogens of the diene experience a more pronounced  KIE than the "outside" hydrogens" and the C1 and C4 experience a significant KIE. These key observations suggest an asynchronous reaction mechanism for the cycloaddition of isoprene with maleic anhydride.

The limitations for determining KIE's at natural abundance using NMR are that the recovered material must have a suitable amount and purity for NMR analysis (the signal of interest should be distinct from other signals), the reaction of interest must be irreversible, and the reaction mechanism must not change for the duration of the chemical reaction.

Experimental details for using quantitative single pulse NMR to measure kinetic isotope effect at natural abundance as follows: the experiment needs to be performed under quantitative conditions including a relaxation time of 5 T1, measured 90° flip angle, a digital resolution of at least 5 points across a peak, and a signal:noise greater than 250. The raw FID is zero-filled to at least 256K points before the Fourier transform. NMR spectra are phased and then treated with a zeroth order baseline correction without any tilt correction. Signal integrations are determined numerically with a minimal tolerance for each integrated signal.

Organometallic reaction mechanism elucidation examples 
Colletto et al. developed a regioselective -arylation of benzo[b]thiophenes at room temperature with aryl iodides as coupling partners and sought to understand the mechanism of this reaction by performing natural abundance kinetic isotope effect measurements via single pulse NMR.

The observation of a primary 13C isotope effect at C3, an inverse 2H isotope effect, a secondary 13C isotope effect at C2, and the lack of an 2H isotope effect at C2 lead Colletto et al. to suggest a Heck-type reaction mechanism for the regioselective -arylation of benzo[b]thiophenes at room temperature with aryl iodides as coupling partners.

Frost et al. sought to understand the effects of Lewis acid additives on the mechanism of enantioselective palladium catalyzed C-N bond activation using natural abundance kinetic isotope effect measurements via single pulse NMR.

The primary 13C kinetic isotope effect observed in the absence of BPh3 suggests a reaction mechanism with rate limiting cis oxidation into the C–CN bond of the cyanoformamide. The addition of BPh3 causes a relative decrease in the observed 13C kinetic isotope effect which led Frost et al. to suggest a change in the rate limiting step from cis oxidation to coordination of palladium to the cyanoformamide.

DEPT-55 NMR 
Although kinetic isotope effect measurements at natural abundance are a powerful tool for understanding reaction mechanisms, the amounts of material required for analysis can make this technique inaccessible for reactions that employ expensive reagents or unstable starting materials. In order to mitigate these limitations, Jacobsen and coworkers developed 1H to 13C polarization transfer as a means to reduce the time and material required for kinetic isotope effect measurements at natural abundance. The distortionless enhancement by polarization transfer (DEPT) takes advantage of the larger gyromagnetic ratio of 1H over 13C  to theoretically improve measurement sensitivity by a factor of 4 or decrease experiment time by a factor of 16. This method for natural abundance kinetic isotope measurement is favorable for analysis for reactions containing unstable starting materials, and catalysts or products that are relatively costly.

Jacobsen and coworkers identified the thiourea-catalyzed glycosylation of galactose as a reaction that met both of the aforementioned criteria (expensive materials and unstable substrates) and was a reaction with a poorly understood mechanism. Glycosylation is a special case of nucleophilic substitution that lacks clear definition between SN1 and SN2 mechanistic character. The presence of the oxygen adjacent to the site of displacement (i.e., C1) can stabilize positive charge. This charge stabilization can cause any potential concerted pathway to become asynchronous and approaches intermediates with oxocarbenium character of the SN1 mechanism for glycosylation.

Jacobsen and coworkers observed small normal KIE's at C1, C2, and C5 which suggests significant oxocarbenium character in the transition state and an asynchronous reaction mechanism with a large degree of charge separation.

Isotope-ratio mass spectrometry 

High precision isotope-ratio mass spectrometry (IRMS) is another method for measuring kinetic fractionation of isotopes for natural abundance KIE measurements. Widlanski and coworkers demonstrated  KIE at natural abundance measurements for the hydrolysis of sulfate monoesters. Their observation of a large KIE suggests S-O bond cleavage is rate controlling and likely rules out an associate reaction mechanism.

The major limitation for determining KIE's at natural abundance using IRMS is the required site selective degradation without isotopic fractionation into an analyzable small molecule, a non-trivial task.

Case studies

Primary hydrogen isotope effects 

Primary hydrogen kinetic isotope effects refer to cases in which a bond to the isotopically labeled hydrogen is formed or broken at a rate- and/or product-determining step of a reaction. These are the most commonly measured kinetic isotope effects, and much of the previously covered theory refers to primary kinetic isotope effects.
When there is adequate evidence that transfer of the labeled hydrogen occurs in the rate-determining step of a reaction, if a fairly large kinetic isotope effect is observed, e.g. kH/kD of at least 5-6 or kH/kT about 10–13 at room temperature, it is quite likely that the hydrogen transfer is linear and that the hydrogen is fairly symmetrically located in the transition state. It is usually not possible to make comments about tunneling contributions to the observed isotope effect unless the effect is very large. If the primary kinetic isotope effect is not as large, it is generally considered to be indicative of a significant contribution from heavy-atom motion to the reaction coordinate, although it may also mean that hydrogen transfer follows a nonlinear pathway.

Secondary hydrogen isotope effects 

The secondary hydrogen isotope effects or secondary kinetic isotope effect (SKIE) arises in cases where the isotopic substitution is remote from the bond being broken.  The remote atom, nonetheless, influences the internal vibrations of the system that via changes in the zero point energy (ZPE) affect the rates of chemical reactions. Such effects are expressed as ratios of rate for the light isotope to that of the heavy isotope and can be "normal" (ratio is greater than or equal to 1) or "inverse" (ratio is less than 1) effects. SKIE are defined as α,β (etc.) secondary isotope effects where such prefixes refer to the position of the isotopic substitution relative to the reaction center (see alpha and beta carbon). The prefix α refers to the isotope associated with the reaction center while the prefix β refers to the isotope associated with an atom neighboring the reaction center and so on.

In physical organic chemistry, SKIE is discussed in terms of electronic effects such as induction, bond hybridization, or hyperconjugation. These properties are determined by electron distribution, and depend upon vibrationally averaged bond length and angles that are not greatly affected by isotopic substitution. Thus, the use of the term "electronic isotope effect" while legitimate is discouraged from use as it can be misinterpreted to suggest that the isotope effect is electronic in nature rather than vibrational.

SKIE's can be explained in terms of changes in orbital hybridization. When the hybridization of a carbon atom changes from sp3 to sp2, a number of vibrational modes (stretches, in-plane and out-of-plane bending) are affected. The in-plane and out-of-plane bending in an sp3 hybridized carbon are similar in frequency due to the symmetry of an sp3 hybridized carbon. In an sp2 hybridized carbon the in-plane bend is much stiffer than the out-of-plane bending resulting in a large difference in the frequency, the ZPE and thus the SKIE (which exists when there is a difference in the ZPE of the reactant and transition state).
The theoretical maximum change caused by the bending frequency difference has been calculated as 1.4.

When carbon undergoes a reaction that changes its hybridization from sp3 to sp2, the out of plane bending force constant at the transition state is weaker as it is developing sp2 character and a "normal" SKIE is observed with typical values of 1.1 to 1.2. Conversely, when carbon's hybridization changes from sp2 to sp3, the out of plane bending force constants at the transition state increase and an inverse SKIE is observed with typical values of 0.8 to 0.9.

More generally the SKIE for reversible reactions can be "normal" one way and "inverse" the other if bonding in the transition state is midway in stiffness between substrate and product, or they can be "normal" both ways if bonding is weaker in the transition state, or "inverse" both ways if bonding is stronger in the transition state than in either reactant.

An example of an "inverse" α secondary kinetic isotope effect can be seen in the work of Fitzpatrick and Kurtz who used such an effect to distinguish between two proposed pathways for the reaction of d-amino acid oxidase with nitroalkane anions. Path A involved a nucleophilic attack on the coenzyme FAD, while path B involves a free-radical intermediate. As path A results in the intermediate carbon changing hybridization from sp2 to sp3 an "inverse" a SKIE is expected. If path B occurs then no SKIE should be observed as the free radical intermediate does not change hybridization. An SKIE of 0.84 was observed and Path A verified as shown in the scheme below.

Another example of a SKIE is the oxidation of benzyl alcohols by dimethyldioxirane where three transition states for different mechanisms were proposed. Again, by considering how and if the hydrogen atoms were involved in each, researchers predicted whether or not they would expect an effect of isotopic substitution of them. Then, analysis of the experimental data for the reaction allowed them to choose which pathway was most likely based on the observed isotope effect.

Secondary hydrogen isotope effects from the methylene hydrogens were also used to show that Cope rearrangement in 1,5-hexadiene follow a concerted bond rearrangement pathway, and not one of the alternatively proposed allyl radical or 1,4-diyl pathways, all of which are presented in the following scheme.

Alternative mechanisms for the Cope rearrangement of 1,5-hexadiene: (from top to bottom), allyl radical, synchronous concerted, and 1,4-dyil pathways. The predominant pathway is found to be the middle one, which has six delocalized π electrons corresponding to an aromatic intermediate.

Steric isotope effects 

The steric isotope effect is a SKIE that does not involve bond breaking or formation. This effect is attributed to the different vibrational amplitudes of isotopologues. An example of such an effect is the racemization of 9,10-dihydro-4,5-dimethylphenanthrene. The smaller amplitude of vibration for deuterium as compared to hydrogen in C–H (carbon–hydrogen), C–D (carbon–deuterium) bonds results in a smaller van der Waals radius or effective size in addition to a difference in the ZPE between the two. When there is a greater effective bulk of molecules containing one over the other this may be manifested by a steric effect on the rate constant. For the example above deuterium racemizes faster than the hydrogen isotopologue resulting in a steric isotope effect.  A model for the steric isotope effect was developed by Bartell. A steric isotope effect is usually small, unless the transformations passes through a transition state with severe steric encumbrance, as in the racemization process shown above.

Another example of the steric isotope effect is in the deslipping reaction of rotaxanes. The deuterium isotope, due to its smaller effective size, allows easier passage of the stoppers through the macrocycle, resulting in faster rates of deslipping for the deuterated rotaxanes.

Inverse kinetic isotope effects 
Reactions are known where the deuterated species reacts faster than the undeuterated analogue, and these cases are said to exhibit inverse kinetic isotope effects (IKIE). IKIE's are often observed in the reductive elimination of alkyl metal hydrides, e.g. (Me2NCH2CH2NMe2)PtMe(H). In such cases the C-D bond in the transition state, an agostic species, is highly stabilized relative to the C–H bond.

An inverse effect can also occur in a multistep reaction if the overall rate constant depends on a pre-equilibria prior to the rate-determining step which has an inverse equilibrium isotope effect. For example, the rates of acid-catalyzed reactions are usually 2-3 times greater for reactions in D2O catalyzed by D3O+ than for the analogous reactions in H2O catalyzed by H3O+ This can be explained for a mechanism of specific hydrogen-ion catalysis of a reactant R by H3O+ (or D3O+).
H3O+ + R  RH+ + H2O
RH+ + H2O → H3O+ + P
The rate of formation of products is then d[P]/dt = k2[RH+] = k2K1[H3O+][R] = kobs[H3O+][R]. In the first step, H3O+ is usually a stronger acid than RH+. Deuteration shifts the equilibrium toward the more strongly bound acid species RD+ in which the effect of deuteration on zero-point vibrational energy is greater, so that the deuterated equilibrium constant K1D is greater than K1H. This equilibrium isotope effect in the first step usually outweighs the kinetic isotope effect in the second step, so that there is an apparent inverse isotope effect and the observed overall rate constant kobs = k2K1 decreases.

Solvent hydrogen kinetic isotope effects 

For the solvent isotope effects to be measurable, a finite fraction of the solvent must have a different isotopic composition than the rest.  Therefore, large amounts of the less common isotopic species must be available, limiting observable solvent isotope effects to isotopic substitutions involving hydrogen. Detectable kinetic isotope effects occur only when solutes exchange hydrogen with the solvent or when there is a specific solute-solvent interaction near the reaction site. Both such phenomena are common for protic solvents, in which the hydrogen is exchangeable, and they may form dipole-dipole interactions or hydrogen bonds with polar molecules.

Carbon-13 isotope effects 
Most organic reactions involve the breaking and making of bonds to a carbon; thus, it is reasonable to expect detectable carbon isotope effects. When 13C is used as the label, the change in mass of the isotope is only ~8%, though, which limits the observable kinetic isotope effects to much smaller values than the ones observable with hydrogen isotope effects.

Compensating for variations in 13C natural abundance 
Often, the largest source of error in a study that depends on the natural abundance of carbon is the slight variation in natural 13C abundance itself. Such variations arise because the starting materials used in the reaction are themselves products of some other reactions that have kinetic isotope effects and corresponding isotopic enrichments in the products. To compensate for this error when NMR spectroscopy is used to determine the kinetic isotope effect, the following guidelines have been proposed:
 Choose a carbon that is remote from the reaction center that will serve as a reference and assume it does not have a kinetic isotope effect in the reaction.
 In the starting material that has not undergone any reaction, determine the ratios of the other carbon NMR peak integrals to that of the reference carbon.
 Obtain the same ratios for the carbons in a sample of the starting material after it has undergone some reaction.
 The ratios of the latter ratios to the former ratios yields R/R0.
If these as well as some other precautions listed by Jankowski are followed, kinetic isotope effects with precisions of three decimal places can be achieved.

Isotope effects with elements heavier than carbon 

Interpretation of carbon isotope effects are usually complicated by simultaneously forming and breaking bonds to carbon. Even reactions that involve only bond cleavage from the carbon, such as SN1 reactions, involve strengthening of the remaining bonds to carbon. In many such reactions, leaving group isotope effects tend to be easier to interpret. For example, substitution and elimination reactions in which chlorine act as a leaving group are convenient to interpret, especially since chlorine acts as a monatomic species with no internal bonding to complicate the reaction coordinate, and it has two stable isotopes, 35Cl and 37Cl, both with high abundance. The major challenge to the interpretation of such isotope affects is the solvation of the leaving group.

Owing to experimental uncertainties, measurement of isotope effect may entail significant uncertainty.  Often isotope effects are determined through complementary studies on a series of isotopomers. Accordingly, it is quite useful to combine hydrogen isotope effects with heavy-atom isotope effects. For instance, determining nitrogen isotope effect along with hydrogen isotope effect was used to show that the reaction of 2-phenylethyltrimethylammonium ion with ethoxide in ethanol at 40 °C follows an E2 mechanism, as opposed to alternative non-concerted mechanisms. This conclusion was reached upon showing that this reaction yields a nitrogen isotope effect, k14/k15, of 1.0133±0.0002 along with a hydrogen kinetic isotope effect of 3.2 at the leaving hydrogen.

Similarly, combining nitrogen and hydrogen isotope effects was used to show that syn eliminations of simple ammonium salts also follow a concerted mechanism, which was a question of debate before. In the following two reactions of 2-phenylcyclopentyltrimethylammonium ion with ethoxide, both of which yield 1-phenylcyclopentene, both isomers exhibited a nitrogen isotope effect k14/k15 at 60 °C. Although the reaction of the trans isomer, which follows syn elimination, has a smaller nitrogen kinetic isotope effect (1.0064) compared to the cis isomer which undergoes anti elimination (1.0108), both results are large enough to be indicative of weakening of the C-N bond in the transition state that would occur in a concerted process.

Other examples 

Since kinetic isotope effects arise from differences in isotopic masses, the largest observable kinetic isotope effects are associated with isotopic substitutions of hydrogen with deuterium (100% increase in mass) or tritium (200% increase in mass). Kinetic isotope effects from isotopic mass ratios can be as large as 36.4 using muons. They have produced the lightest hydrogen atom, 0.11H (0.113 amu), in which an electron orbits around a positive muon (μ+) "nucleus" that has a mass of 206 electrons. They have also prepared the heaviest hydrogen atom analogue by replacing one electron in helium with a negative muon (μ−) to form Heμ with an atomic mass of 4.116 amu. Since the negative muon is much heavier than an electron, it orbits much closer to the nucleus, effectively shielding one proton, making Heμ to behave as 4.1H. With these exotic species, the reaction of H with 1H2 was investigated. Rate constants from reacting the lightest and the heaviest hydrogen analogues with 1H2 were then used to calculate the k0.11/k4.1 kinetic isotope effect, in which there is a 36.4 fold difference in isotopic masses. For this reaction, isotopic substitution happens to produce an inverse kinetic isotope effect, and the authors report a kinetic isotope effect as low as 1.74 x 10−4, which is the smallest kinetic isotope effect ever reported.

The kinetic isotope effect leads to a specific distribution of deuterium isotopes in natural products, depending on the route they were synthesized in nature. By NMR spectroscopy, it is therefore easy to detect whether the alcohol in wine was fermented from glucose, or from illicitly added saccharose.

Another reaction mechanisms that was elucidated using the kinetic isotope effect is the halogenation of toluene:

In this particular "intramolecular KIE" study, a benzylic hydrogen undergoes radical substitution by bromine using N-bromosuccinimide as the brominating agent. It was found that PhCH3 brominates 4.86x faster than PhCD3. A large KIE of 5.56 is associated with the reaction of ketones with bromine and sodium hydroxide.

In this reaction the rate-limiting step is formation of the enolate by deprotonation of the ketone. In this study the KIE is calculated from the reaction rate constants for regular 2,4-dimethyl-3-pentanone and its deuterated isomer by optical density measurements.

In asymmetric catalysis, there are rare instances in which a kinetic isotope effect manifests as a significant difference in the enantioselectivity observed for a deuterated substrate compared to a non-deuterated one.  One example was reported by Toste and coworkers, in which a deuterated substrate produced an enantioselectivity of 83% ee, compared to 93% ee for the undeuterated substrate.  The effect was taken to corroborate additional inter- and intramolecular competition KIE data that suggested cleavage of the C-H/D bond in the enantiodetermining step.

See also 
 Crossover experiment (chemistry)
 Equilibrium constant#Effect of isotopic substitution
 Isotope effect on lipid peroxidation
 Kinetic Isotope Effects of RuBisCO (ribulose-1,5-bisphosphate carboxylase oxygenase)
 Magnetic isotope effect
 Reaction mechanism
 Transient kinetic isotope fractionation
 Urey-Bigeleisen-Mayer equation

References

Further reading 

 

Organic chemistry
Physical organic chemistry
Chemical kinetics
Reaction mechanisms